Kostenets is a rural locality (a settlement) in Malyshevskoye Rural Settlement, Selivanovsky District, Vladimir Oblast, Russia. The population was 260 as of 2010.

Geography 
Kostenets is located 37 km southwest of Krasnaya Gorbatka (the district's administrative centre) by road. Yuromka is the nearest rural locality.

References 

Rural localities in Selivanovsky District